James Craggs the Elder (1657 – 16 March 1721), of Jermyn Street, Westminster and Charlton, Lewisham, Kent,  was an English financier and Whig politician who sat in the English and British House of Commons from 1702 to 1713.

Life
Craggs was baptized on 10 June 1657, the eldest son of Anthony Craggs of Wolsingham, county of Durham, and his wife  Anne Morcroft, daughter of Rev. Ferdinando Morcroft, DD, of Goswich, Lancashire, rector of Stanhope-in-Wardell, county Durham and prebendary of Durham. He was educated at Bishop Auckland grammar school.
 
After following various callings in London, Craggs, who was a person of considerable financial ability, entered the service of the Duchess of Marlborough. Through her influence he was returned at the 1702 English general election as Member of Parliament for Grampound. He retained the seat until the 1713 British general election.

Craggs was in business as an army clothier and held several official positions, becoming joint Postmaster-General in 1715. Making  the most of his opportunities in all these capacities, he amassed a great deal of money. Craggs also increased his wealth by mixing in the affairs of the South Sea Company, but after his death an act of parliament confiscated all the property which he had acquired since December 1719. He left an enormous fortune when he died in disgrace for his involvement in the South Sea Bubble, a month after the death of his son. It is possible that Craggs the Elder committed suicide.

He married Elizabeth Richards, daughter of the Irish artillery officer Jacob Richards corn chandler, of Westminster on 4 January 1684. Their children included James Craggs the Younger, and Anne Craggs, wife of Robert Nugent, 1st Earl Nugent, Elizabeth wife of Edward Eliot and Margaret wife, firstly of Samuel Trefusis and secondly of Sir John Hinde Cotton.

References

1657 births
1721 deaths
Members of the pre-1707 English Parliament for constituencies in Cornwall
Members of the Parliament of Great Britain for constituencies in Cornwall
British MPs 1707–1708
British MPs 1708–1710
British MPs 1710–1713
United Kingdom Postmasters General
English MPs 1702–1705
English MPs 1705–1707